Zhang Xingbo (born 17 January 1994) is a Chinese footballer currently playing as a midfielder for Zibo Cuju, on loan from Chongqing Liangjiang.

Career statistics

Club
.

References

1994 births
Living people
Chinese footballers
Association football midfielders
China League Two players
China League One players
Chinese Super League players
Guangdong South China Tiger F.C. players
Guangzhou F.C. players
Inner Mongolia Zhongyou F.C. players
Liaoning Shenyang Urban F.C. players
Chongqing Liangjiang Athletic F.C. players
21st-century Chinese people